Nature's Sunshine Products, Incorporated, also known as "NSP", is a manufacturer and multi-level marketer of dietary supplements, including herbs, vitamins, minerals, and personal care products. It is based in Lehi, Utah, with a manufacturing facility in Spanish Fork, Utah.

History

Nature's Sunshine was founded in 1972 by Gene and Kristine Hughes, who started encapsulating capsicum in their home kitchen.  The company employs a multi-level marketing business model in which their products are primarily sold to the consumer by independent distributors who receive commissions based on their own sales, as well as sign-up bonuses and commissions based upon the sales of any distributors they may have recruited.

NSP also owns Synergy Worldwide, a multi-level marketing company that also sells nutritional supplements. Products for both companies are manufactured in a production and research facility located in Spanish Fork, Utah.

In June 2021, Nature’s Sunshine Products, Inc. and the David Eccles School of Business at the University of Utah partnered together to create a new scholarship. Nature’s Sunshine Products, Inc. partnered with the Opportunity Scholars program to provide full-ride scholarships to underrepresented students who are the first in their family to attend college.

SEC bribery lawsuit 
On July 31, 2009, the company agreed to pay $600,000 in fines after being charged by the SEC with having bribed Brazilian officials with more than $1,000,000 in 2000 and 2001. This was done "so it could import unregistered nutritional products into the country, and then falsified its books to hide the payments."

References

External links

 

Companies based in Utah County, Utah
Companies listed on the Nasdaq
Manufacturing companies established in 1972
Multi-level marketing companies based in Utah
Spanish Fork, Utah
1972 establishments in Utah